The 2012 Monza Superbike World Championship round was the fourth round of the 2012 Superbike World Championship season and of the 2012 Supersport World Championship season. It took place on the weekend of May 4–6, 2012 at the Autodromo Nazionale Monza located in Monza, Italy.

Superbike

Report
At this round the championship held an awards ceremony marking their 25th anniversary, this however would be a round full of incident, the conditions were changeable throughout the weekend, and during a wet superpole riders were unable to make their wet tyres last more than 2 laps due to the tyres falling apart down the center due to the high speed nature of the Monza circuit. The race started dry but Mark Aitchison fell at the final turn on the warm up lap then John Hopkins and Marco Melandri, would also go down at the final turn. The race was stopped as the rain persisted and race 1 was canceled on safety grounds.
Race 2 was run in similar conditions with the rain falling just after half distance meaning that half points were awarded. After the debacle Team Effenbert Liberty Racing hit out at WSBK organizers for favoring a few riders in the cancellation of race 1, putting doubt into their further participation in the championship. Pirelli the lone tyre provider hit back at complaints from the riders who Pirelli say ignored the advice to use the intermediate tyres during the wet/dry racing. 
Liberty racing later released a statement backtracking on was said in the wake of Monza and confirming that the team would be competing at the next round but hinted that the title sponsor Effenbert may scale back their branding in way of protest.

Race 2 classification

Supersport

Race classification

References

External links
 The official website of the Superbike World Championship

Monza Superbike World Championship
Monza